Kanjo Nawa is a Japanese custom of stretching shimenawa, a variety of laid rope, with fetishes hung at the border of a village.  is just a similar custom. The term Kanjo Nawa also refers to the rope itself.

In rural area around Japan, there remains the custom of enshrining the items such as ropes of straw and grass, dolls, and straw sandals at the border of the village intended to prevent the evil such as an epidemic from entering the village, or to drive out the evil. 

The custom called Kanjo Nawa can be found around Kinki Region, especially in Wakasa, Fukui Prefecture, in the east and south of Shiga Prefecture, in Iga, Mie Prefecture, in the east mountainous region of Nara Prefecture, and in Minami-Yamashiro of Kyoto Prefecture. Kanjo Nawa is also known as Kanjo Tsuri (勧請吊).

Examples 
Kanjo Nawa in Asukaji, Kasagi, Kyoto
In Asukaji, in every January, villagers create Shimenawa, which is stretched over Nunome-Gawa River, running through the village, in order to pray for prosperity and safety. One person per household is supposed to attend the event. Tsukurimono (ツクリモノ), imitating farming equipment, daily-life instrument or sexual organs, is hung on Shimenawa. It was recognized as Intangible Folk Cultural Properties in 1998.

See also 
  – Similar custom 
 Shimenawa

References

External links 
 Kanjo Nawa (Sacred Rope Protecting Local People From Evil Spirits) – explanation by the local government of Kasagi Town

Japanese folk religion
Japanese religious terminology